Thomas O'Reilly (died 1944) was an Irish Fianna Fáil politician. A national school teacher, he was first elected to Dáil Éireann as a Fianna Fáil Teachta Dála (TD) at the June 1927 general election for the Kerry constituency. He was re-elected at the September 1927 general election and at the 1932 general election. He did not contest the 1933 general election.

References

Year of birth missing
1944 deaths
Fianna Fáil TDs
Members of the 5th Dáil
Members of the 6th Dáil
Members of the 7th Dáil
Politicians from County Kerry